Torrey Pines can refer to:
Torrey pine, a broad, open-crowned pine
Torrey Pines Gliderport, a historic motorless flight facility in San Diego, California
Torrey Pines Golf Course, a municipal public golf course owned by the city of San Diego, California
Torrey Pines High School, a high school in the North County Coastal area of San Diego, California
Torrey Pines, San Diego, a coastal community within San Diego, California
Torrey Pines State Natural Reserve
Torrey Pines Stakes, a thoroughbred horse race at Del Mar Racetrack in Del Mar, California
"Torrey Pines", a song by Your Heart Breaks